Doljani may refer to several places:

Bosnia and Herzegovina 
 Doljani, Bihać, a village in the Bihać municipality
 Doljani, Čapljina, a village in the Čapljina municipality
 Doljani, Hadžići, a village in the Hadžići municipality
 Doljani, Jablanica, a village in the Jablanica municipality
 Doljani, Konjic, a village in the Konjic municipality

Croatia 
 Doljani, Bjelovar-Bilogora County, a village in the Daruvar municipality
 Doljani, Donji Lapac, a village in the Donji Lapac municipality of Lika-Senj County
 , a village in the Otočac municipality of Lika-Senj County
 , a village in the Ozalj municipality

Montenegro 
Doljani, Montenegro, a village in the Podgorica municipality

Serbia 
 Doljani (Novi Pazar), a village near Novi Pazar
 Doljani, Ostružnica, an abandoned village near Čukarica, Belgrade